Phasianotrochus bellulus, common name the necklace shell, is a species of sea snail, a marine gastropod mollusk in the family Trochidae, the top snails.

Description
The height of the shell varies between 12 mm and 18 mm. The solid, imperforate, acute shell has an elongate-conic shape. It is polished, grayish or pinkish, with a few spiral orange lines, two on the penultimate whorl.  The spaces between these lines marked with short white curved lines in pairs, often forming a figure 8 shaped pattern. The about 8 whorls are  nearly flat. The body whorl is rounded at the periphery. The spire is attenuated toward the acute purplish apex. The small aperture is contracted, sulcate and iridescent within. The vertical columella is strongly toothed below.

The color pattern is quite constant and characteristic. The interior of the aperture is more coarsely sulcate than in other species, showing only about 6 folds. The outer and basal lips have a slight submarginal porcellaneous subdentate thickening, which stops a little space short of the upper termination
of the outer lip,

Distribution
This marine species is endemic to Australia and occurs in the shallow subtidal zones off Victoria, Southwest Australia and Tasmania.

References

 Philippi, R.A. 1845. Abbildungen und Beschriebungen neuer oder wenig gekannter Conchylien. Cassel : Theodor Fischer Vol. 2 64 pp
 Angas, G.F. 1865. On the marine molluscan fauna of the Province of South Australia, with a list of all the species known up to the present time, together with remarks on their habitats and distribution, etc. Proceedings of the Zoological Society of London 1865: 155-"180"
 Allan, J.K. 1950. Australian Shells: with related animals living in the sea, in freshwater and on the land. Melbourne : Georgian House xix, 470 pp., 45 pls, 112 text figs.
 Cotton, B.C. 1959. South Australian Mollusca. Archaeogastropoda. Handbook of the Flora and Fauna of South Australia. Adelaide : South Australian Government Printer 449 pp
 Wilson, B. 1993. Australian Marine Shells. Prosobranch Gastropods. Kallaroo, Western Australia : Odyssey Publishing Vol. 1

External links
 To Biodiversity Heritage Library (2 publications)
 To World Register of Marine Species
 

bellulus
Gastropods of Australia
Gastropods described in 1845